Muthukulam Parvathy Amma (1904–1977) was a Malayalam language poet, teacher, translator, freedom fighter and social reformer from Kerala, India. She published books in various genres of literature, including poetry, short poems, plays, short stories, children's literature, translations and biographies. Parvathy Amma, a follower of Narayana Guru, supported the Indian freedom struggle, and was inclined towards the Indian National Congress. Muthukulam Parvathy Amma Award is a literary award given to woman writers.

Biography
Parvathy Amma was born on 26 January 1904 in Thattakkattusseri house in Muthukulam in present-day Alappuzha district, the daughter of P. Rama Panicker and Velumbiamma. Her elder brother, who was also a Sanskrit scholar, played a significant role in the care of Parvathy Amma as their father died when she was a child.

After studying under Krishnan Nair of Muthukulam, she was educated at VMG School, Kirikadu and VH School, Kollam. After passing the Vdwan and Visharad examinations from the University of Madras, she started her career as a teacher.

Parvathy Amma, a follower of Narayana Guru wanted to establish a sangha (group) of women followers of the Guru. The Mahila Ashram (ashram for women) she wanted to set up was a refuge like that which existed for the Buddhist nuns.

Parvati Amma, who supported the Indian freedom struggle, was inclined towards the Indian National Congress. She campaigned for the Congress party in the 1960 general elections and traveled all over Kerala, speaking at various meetings. The play Save India written by her for the election campaign was performed allover the Kerala. She also took part in the struggles related to the Vaikom Satyagraha.

The women of Muthukulam have long wanted a maternity ward at the Muthukulam Public Health Center. Parvati Amma is one of the prominent people who worked to make this possible. She was a great propagandist of Gandhian ideas and actively participated in anti-alcohol activities and wrote and preached extensively to educate the people about the evils of alcoholism.

Parvathi Amma, who was also a dancer, was the headmistress at the Harippad Government Girls' School when she composed the Kayarupinni Thiruvathira, a modification of traditional Thiruvathira dance.

She died on September 15, 1977.

Literary career
Started writing poetry at the age of twelve, Parvathy Amma's first work named Yathartha jeevitham (meaning:real life) was published in T. C. Kalyaniyamma's Sharda, a women's magazine. The introduction to the first collection of poems published under the name Udayaprabha (meaning:morning light) was written by Ulloor. Ulloor observe that her style is very close to that of Kumaran Asan.

On Sree Narayana Guru’s birthday celebrations in 1924, She had prepared and sung a felicitation in verse, written in the Kilippattu style dedicating to the Guru. Hearing the poem, Guru praised her very much.

She has published books in various genres of literature, including poetry, short poems, plays, short stories, translations and biographies. Sreebudha Charitha (biography of Buddha) the incomplete work of the poet Kumaran Asan was completed by Parvati Amma. She has also written one act plays for children.

Works
Udayaprabha
Sree Chithira Maha Vijayam
Maathru Vilapam (meaning:Mother's lament)

Oru Vilapam (meaning:A lament)

Gananjali
Gana Devatha (meaning:Goddess of Songs)
Pookkari (meaning:Florist) (poetry collections)
Bhuvanadeepika
Ahalya
Save India (play)
Dharma Bali (play)
Karmaphalam
Kathamanjari (stories)
Sree Narayana Margam (philosophy)
Randu Devathakal (meaning:Two Goddesses) (Biography)
Sri Buddha charitam
Srimad Bhagavad Gita (translation)Geethanjali (translation)Bharatheeya Vanithakal (meaning:Indian Women) (Translations)

Works on her
Her biography published in 2005 is written by V. Dethan and published by Fabian Books, Nooranad. In 2016, Kerala Bhasha Institute published Parvathy Amma's biography named Muthukulam Parvathy Amma written by Nirmala Rajagopal.

Muthukulam Parvathy Amma Award
Muthukulam Parvathy Amma Award is a literary award given to woman writers, in the name of Parvati Amma. The award consists of Rs. 10,000 and a Certificate of Merit. Works from any literary genre will be considered for the award. Works that have been published for the first time in the last three years will be considered for the award.

Awardees

2003: Chandramathi
2010: C. S. Chandrika, for her essay titled Aarthavamulla Sthreekal.
2017: Shahina E. K.
2019: Jisha Abhinaya, for Eli Eli Lama Sabaktani a collection of plays.
2020: E. K. Sheeba, for the work Manja Nadikalude Sooryan.
2021: V. P. Suhra, for her autobiography Jorayude Katha'' (meaning:'The Story of Jora')

References

1904 births
1977 deaths
Malayalam-language writers
Malayalam poets
Indian women short story writers
Indian independence activists from Kerala
Indian women poets
20th-century Indian women writers
20th-century Indian poets
Indian social reformers
People from Alappuzha district
Women writers from Kerala
Women Indian independence activists